James Earl Rutherford (born February 17, 1949) is a Canadian former professional ice hockey goaltender and executive. He is the president of hockey operations of the Vancouver Canucks of the National Hockey League (NHL). Prior to his position with the Canucks, Rutherford held the same position with the Hartford Whalers/Carolina Hurricanes for almost two decades, assuming the position in June 1994 and stepping down from that position in April 2014. He then joined the Pittsburgh Penguins as general manager, having been named to that position on June 6, 2014, and resigning on January 27, 2021, citing "personal reasons". Rutherford has won the Stanley Cup three times as a general manager, with the Hurricanes in 2006 and with the Penguins in 2016 and 2017.

Playing career
Rutherford played in the NHL from 1969 to 1983; the majority of his career was spent with the Detroit Red Wings, but he also spent time with the Pittsburgh Penguins, Toronto Maple Leafs, and Los Angeles Kings. As a goaltender Rutherford won 151, lost 227 and tied 59 games. Rutherford retired as a player in 1983 at the age of 33.

Post-playing career
Prior to serving with the Penguins as general manager, Rutherford was the president and general manager, as well as a part-owner of the Carolina Hurricanes – known as the Hartford Whalers until 1997 – having joined the franchise in 1994 and helping build the Hurricanes team that won the Stanley Cup in 2006. Later he helped build the Penguins team that won the Stanley Cup in 2016 and again in 2017.

Rutherford was one of the pioneers of the popular trend of ice hockey goaltenders decorating his mask in 1976. Initially, a friend painted a pair of red wings at the temples of Rutherford's mask without his permission. Because he did not have time to get another fitted mask before game time, he reluctantly wore the decorated mask on the ice. On June 23, 2016, he won the Jim Gregory General Manager of the Year Award. In 2019, Jim Rutherford was inducted into the Hockey Hall of Fame.

Rutherford resigned from his post as general manager of the Penguins on January 27, 2021, due to personal reasons. On December 9, 2021, Rutherford was named president of hockey operations and interim general manager of the Vancouver Canucks.

Career statistics

Regular season and playoffs

International

References

External links
 
 Jim Rutherford's Day with the Stanley Cup

1949 births
Living people
Adirondack Red Wings players
Canadian ice hockey coaches
Canadian ice hockey goaltenders
Carolina Hurricanes executives
Detroit Red Wings draft picks
Detroit Red Wings players
Fort Worth Wings players
Hamilton Red Wings (OHA) players
Hartford Whalers executives
Hershey Bears players
Hockey Hall of Fame inductees
Ice hockey people from Simcoe County
Los Angeles Kings players
National Hockey League executives
National Hockey League first-round draft picks
National Hockey League general managers
New Haven Nighthawks players
Pittsburgh Penguins executives
Pittsburgh Penguins players
Stanley Cup champions
Toronto Maple Leafs players
Vancouver Canucks executives
Windsor Spitfires coaches